There are various consumer brain–computer interfaces available for sale. These are devices that generally use an electroencephalography (EEG) headset to pick up EEG signals, a processor that cleans up and amplifies the signals, and converts them into desired signals, and some kind of output device.  

As of 2012, EEG headsets ranged from simple dry single-contact devices to more elaborate 16-contact, wetted contacts, and output devices included toys like a tube containing a fan that blows harder or softer depending on how hard the user concentrates which in turn moved a ping-pong ball, video games, or a video display of the EEG signal.

Companies developing products in the space have taken different approaches.

Neurosky grew out of work in  an academic lab in Korea in the early 2000s; the team used an EEG headset to control the speed of a remote-controlled car and their device also used Eye tracking to control the direction the car moved.  The scientists initially intended to establish a company that would develop and sell toys, but when the company was founded in Silicon Valley, it focused mostly on providing devices and software to other companies as an OEM.  In 2010 the company released a product called Mindwave with one contact, a processor, an application (and a mobile app) that could display the EEG signal, and several games and other apps; the included an API so developers could create new apps using the data.

In 2007 the Canadian scientist Ariel Garten formed InteraXon with Trevor Coleman and Chris Aimone to commercialize her and her mentor Steve Mann's research on brain–computer interfaces, with an initial focus on output devices that could do practical tasks like turn off lights, control audio devices, or move objects. The company released a headset and processor called Muse with seven electrodes, with an app and an API.

In the 2010s French scientists Yohan Attal and Thibaud Dumas founded myBrain to commercialize their research, and worked with the Brain and Spine Institute (ICM) in Paris to create an EEG headset called melomind with four electrodes, with an app for stress management.

Around the same time OpenBCI was founded by Joel Murphy to create an open source set of devices, processors, and software aimed at biohackers and researchers that incorporates other sensors along with EEG electrodes.

At the end of 2020, NextMind began shipping their visual BCI which utilizes an EEG headset with dry electrodes. Founded by cognitive neuroscientist Sid Kouider, the company offers their product as a dev kit to make neurotechnology accessible to a wider audience of developers.

References 

Brain–computer interfacing
Pointing devices
Computing input devices
History of human–computer interaction
Video game control methods